Oslo Axess is a regulated and licensed market under the auspices of the Oslo Stock Exchange.  The purpose is to promote growth among smaller companies, and give them the benefits achieved by having shares traded on a regulated market.

Currently listed companies

See also
 List of companies listed on the Oslo Stock Exchange

References

Companies listed on Oslo Axess
Oslo Axess